Kamikiri (髪切り, hair-cutter) or Kurokamikiri (黒髪切, black hair-cutter) is a Japanese yōkai said to secretly cut people's hair on the head. They were rumored from time to time in the urban areas of the Edo Period, and can sporadically seen in the records from the 17th to the 19th centuries.

Concept
It is thought that they would appear out of nowhere and cut people's hair on their heads without them noticing.

In the collection of stories (setsuwa), the Shokoku Rijidan compiled in the Kanpō years (1741-1743) of the Edo Period, there is written a tale about how near the beginning of Genroku, at Matsusaka, Ise Province (now Matsusaka, Mie Prefecture), and at Konya, Edo, (now Chiyoda, Tokyo, Tokyo), strange paranormal incidents about how people's hair, both male and female, would suddenly be cut off from their motoyui (元結, a hair-tying string) as they were walking along on roads at night. Those people would not notice this at all, and the cut-off hair would fall down on the road still tied up. A similar paranormal incident is recorded to have occurred in the essay Hannichi Kanwa (半日閑話) by Ōta Nanpo at Shitaya in Edo (now Taitō, Tokyo) and in Kohinata (now Bunkyō, Tokyo), and it says that females servants employed at shops and residences would be victims of this.

In Meiji 7 (1874), in Hongō, Tokyo, on the 3rd street at the Suzuki residence, a female servant named "Gin" was a victim of this kamikiri phenomenon, and this was also reported in the newspaper (Tokyo Nichi Nichi Shimbun) at that time. On March 10, some time after 9PM, when Gin was going to the residence's lavatory, she felt a chilly presence and then suddenly had her tied up hair cut, making it very messy. Gin was so startled, she rushed to a nearby home and fainted. The people of that house looked after Gin and listened to what happened, and when they looked around that lavatory, they found the cut-off hair on the floor. Eventually, Gin fell into an illness, and was accepted back by her parents. It became rumored that "in that bathroom, a kamikiri appeared," and it is said that nobody ever tried to go in there ever since.

In the writings of Mizuki Shigeru, it is explained that it would appear when a human tries to marry an animal or ghost, and it would cut off that person's hair.

True identity
Although many documents state that its true identity is unknown, there are legends that can be roughly divided between ones that suppose it was the work of a fox (kitsune), and ones that suppose it is the work of an insect, the kamikiri-mushi (hair-cutting insect).

Fox kamikiri
A diary titled Kennaishi by Madenokōji Tokifusa in the Muromachi period considers it the work of a fox. It quotes the Chinese reference book Taiping Guangji which also writes of a similar story about a fox which cuts hair off of the head.

In the Edo Period writing Mimibukuro, volume 4 Onna no Kami wo Kuu Kitsune no Koto (About How a Fox Ate a Woman's Hair), there is a story about how a fox was captured at the place where someone fell victim to a kamikiri phenomenon, and when the fox's belly was cut open, a large amount of hair was found packed inside. In the Zenan Zuihitsu (善庵随筆), a writing from the Bakumatsu period by the literary scholar Asakawa Zenan, there is written the explanation that a Taoist priest was manipulating a mystical fox to cut hair.

Insect kamikiri
In the late Edo Period, the folk encyclopedia Kiyū Shōran (嬉遊笑覧) writes that in Kan'ei 14 (1637), the kamikiri was the work of an insect called the "kamikiri-mushi" (hair-cutting insect). This kamikiri-mushi is thought to refer not to the actual kamikirimushi, but rather an imagined insect, and it was said that an insect with razor teeth and scissor hands would lurk under the roof. Paintings depicting this kamikiri-mushi would be sold as amulets to ward off evil spirits, and it became a trend to wear paper charms on one's self with the poem "if the hair of a shrine parishoner of a great god shall be cut, let it be a round cloth wig" (千早振神の氏子の髪なれば切とも切れじ玉のかづらを, "chihayaburu; kami no ujiko no; kami nareba; kiritomo kireji; tama no kazura wo").

Human kamikiri

Occupation
From Meiwa 8 (1771) to the next year, there was some furor over how people on Edo and Osaka had their hair cut, which was eventually resolved with the punishment of some shugenja in Edo and wig shopowners in Osaka. The reason for this punishment in Osaka is because it was said that this "kamikiri" was due to the wig shops in order to sell wigs, but it is unknown whether or not they really were behind it, and some see it as a scapegoating in order to quell the unrest. In later years, some shugenja would go around selling paper charms (fuda) that they proclaimed would ward off this kamikiri, leading some suspicion that this was all a set up perpetrated by those shugenja. It is also said that at least part of it really was set up by the shugenja in order to sell some paper charms.

Fetishism
It is said that there would be some fetishists who feel pleasure from cutting off women's hair with a blade, so it is thought that at least some of the kamikiri legends was actually perpetrated by humans. One reason put forth to support this interpretation of humans being behind this is that the examples in literature very often have women whose head hairs were targeted. Engyo Mitamura, a researcher on Edo Period culture and customs, stated in his writings that there have been several examples of people getting caught for the crime of cutting off a person's hair.

Superstition
In Shōwa 6 (1931), one young person was arrested for cutting a girl's hair, who testified "if I cut the hair of a hundred girls and offer them at a shrine, my feeble body will certainly become healthy," thus providing a superstition as the reason for committing kamikiri, so it is thought that this kind of reason may also be what is behind some of the kamikiri crimes.

Other
It is also supposed that rather than being cut by someone or something, that it is simply an illness that results in hair falling off.

In pictures
Starting with the Hyakkai Zukan the emakimono drawn in the Edo Period depict the "kamikiri" as a yōkai with a long beak and scissor-like hands. Although there is no explanatory text that can be found in these emakimono, the pictures depict beside them some long black hair that looks like it was cut off.

Kamikiri no Kidan (1868), a nishiki-e by Utagawa Yoshifuji, also depicts a "kamikiri," but in contrast to the depictions in the aforementioned emakimono, it is depicted as completely black, based on a story of having actually encountered it (refer to the picture).

Tobioni
These Bakemonozukushi Emaki (化け物尽し絵巻) (from the Edo Period, now in private possession and entrusted to a museum of the Fukuoka Prefecture), considered to be a yōkai emaki that was made for putting captions on previously existing yōkai pictures seen in emakimono, introduces the "kamikiri" under the name of "tobioni" (鳶鬼) (for unknown reasons, all the yōkai in this emaki had their names changed). In this caption, they are around the seaside of Izumo Province, and they are considered to eat the meat of small fish, birds, and mice.

Notes

References

See also
List of legendary creatures from Japan

Yōkai